Union County is a county in the U.S. state of Indiana. As of the 2020 United States census, the population was 7,087.  The county seat is Liberty.

Since 2018, Union County has been included in the Cincinnati-Middletown, OH-KY-IN Metropolitan Statistical Area. It is located on the Indiana-Ohio border.

History
The future state of Indiana was first regulated by passage of the Northwest Ordinance in 1787. In 1790 the Territory was divided into two counties, with Knox covering much of present-day Indiana. In 1810, a portion of Knox was partitioned to create Wayne County; in 1811 a portion further south was partitioned to create Franklin. The area between those two counties was partitioned in 1818 to create Fayette; by the 1820s the eastern part of Fayette County was populated sufficiently to warrant separate representation. Thus on 5 January 1821 the state legislature authorized the creation of Union County, with areas ceded from Wayne County, Fayette County and Franklin County. The organization of the new county's governing structure began on 1 February 1821.

It was so named because it united parts of Fayette, Franklin and Wayne counties. The first settlers were from Laurens District, South Carolina. John Templeton was the first settler to enter land at the Cincinnati land office in what would become Harmony Township, Union County Indiana. The first county seat was Brownsville, a small community on the East Fork of the Whitewater River. The seat was moved in 1824 to Liberty, a central location. The primary industry of Union County was and is farming.

Geography
Union County lies on the east side of Indiana; its east border abuts the state of Ohio. Its low rolling hills have now been cleared of timber, although drainage areas are still largely brush-filled. The area is devoted to agricultural or recreational uses. The highest point on the terrain ( ASL) is a rise near the county's north border,  ENE from Witts Station.

Silver Creek flows southwestward through the northeastern part of the county, discharging into Whitewater Lake. The East Fork of Whitewater River flows southward through the upper western part of the county, discharging into Brookville Lake. The lower part of the county is drained by Dubois Creek, flowing westward into Brookville Lake.

Adjacent counties

 Wayne County – north
 Preble County, Ohio – east
 Butler County, Ohio – southeast
 Franklin County – south
 Fayette County – west

Major highways

  U.S. Route 27
  Indiana State Road 44
  Indiana State Road 101
  Indiana State Road 227

Lakes
 Brookville Lake (part)
 Whitewater Lake

Protected areas
 Whitewater Memorial State Park

Quakertown State Recreation Area

Incorporated towns
 Liberty (county seat)
 West College Corner

Unincorporated communities

 Billingsville
 Brownsville
 Charlottesville
 Clifton
 Cottage Grove
 Dunlapsville
 Five Points
 Goodwins Corner
 Hopeville
 Kitchel
 Lotus
 Philomath
 Quakertown
 Roseburg
 Salem
 Witts Station
 Yankee Town

Townships

 Brownsville
 Center
 Harmony
 Harrison
 Liberty
 Union

Climate and weather

Government

The county government is a constitutional body, and is granted specific powers by the Constitution of Indiana, and by the Indiana Code.

County Council: The legislative branch of the county government; controls spending and revenue collection in the county. Representatives are elected to four-year terms from county districts. They set salaries, the annual budget, and special spending. The council has limited authority to impose local taxes, in the form of an income and property tax that is subject to state level approval, excise taxes, and service taxes.

Board of Commissioners: The executive body of the county. Commissioners are elected county-wide to staggered four-year terms. One commissioner serves as president. The commissioners execute acts legislated by the council, collect revenue, and manage county government.

Court: The county maintains a circuit court that can handle all case types. The judge of the court is elected to a term of six years and must be a member of the Indiana Bar Association. In some cases, court decisions can be appealed to the state level appeals court.

County Officials: The county has other elected offices, including sheriff, coroner, auditor, treasurer, recorder, surveyor, and circuit court clerk. These officers are elected to four-year terms. People elected to county government positions are required to be residents of the county.

Demographics

2010 Census
As of the 2010 United States Census, there were 7,516 people, 2,938 households, and 2,117 families in the county. The racial makeup of the county was 97.5% white, 0.4% black or African American, 0.3% Asian, 0.3% American Indian, 0.1% Pacific islander, 0.3% from other races, and 1.1% from two or more races. Those of Hispanic or Latino origin made up 1.1% of the population. In terms of ancestry, 26.2% were German, 16.0% were Irish, 11.9% were English, and 11.6% were American.

Of the 2,938 households, 34.4% had children under the age of 18 living with them, 56.0% were married couples living together, 11.7% had a female householder with no husband present, 27.9% were non-families, and 23.9% of all households were made up of individuals. The average household size was 2.54 and the average family size was 2.99. The median age was 40.3 years.

The median income for a household in the county was $47,697 and the median income for a family was $49,815. Males had a median income of $39,603 versus $27,394 for females. The per capita income for the county was $19,243. About 8.2% of families and 11.9% of the population were below the poverty line, including 21.2% of those under age 18 and 10.0% of those age 65 or over.

Education
Union County is served by the Union County–College Corner Joint School District, the only joint state school district in the state.

Notable people
 Ambrose Everett Burnside (1824–1881), soldier, railroad executive, inventor, industrialist, politician
 Thomas W. Bennett (territorial governor) (1831–1893), governor of Idaho Territory 1871–1875; born in Union County
 Hiram Rhodes Revels (1827–1901), first African-American member of the US Senate, representing Mississippi 1870–1871; attended the Union County Quaker Seminary.
 Bill Bartlett (fl. 1970s-2010s), musician, guitarist for Ram Jam
 Jay Hall Connaway (1893–1970), Realist painter
 Mary Alice Smith (1850-_), aka Little Orphant Annie
 Bob Jenkins (1947–2021), television and radio sports announcer for ESPN/ABC Sports
 Edward E. Moore (1866–1940), Indiana state senator and Los Angeles City Council member
 Walter F. Bossert attorney, Grand Dragon of the Ku Klux Klan during the 1920s
 Joaquin Miller American poet, author, and frontiersman

See also
 National Register of Historic Places listings in Union County, Indiana

References

 
Indiana counties
1821 establishments in Indiana
Populated places established in 1821